Thornton-in-Craven is a village and civil parish in the Craven district of North Yorkshire, England. Barnoldswick is nearby. The Pennine Way passes through the village, as does the A56 road. The village has a church, a primary school and a retirement home, but no shops or pub.

Near the medieval church to the west of the village is a holy well, dating from Saxon times and now covered by an octagonal structure erected in 1764 by the rector.

Thornton-in-Craven railway station was closed when passenger trains over the Skipton to Colne route were withdrawn in 1970. SELRAP are actively pursuing a re-opening of the line which was given a boost in February 2018, when the transport minister, Chris Grayling, ordered a feasibility study into the reopening.

The village playing field, at the bottom of Boothbridge Lane, is home to the first and second XI of Thornton in Craven Cricket Club who compete in different divisions of the Craven League.  The teams are both heavily populated by players from nearby Earby and Barnoldswick, with few representatives from the village itself.  In 2010 the 1st XI were promoted as champions of the 2nd Division after a single season, following relegation from the 1st Division in 2009.  The 2nd Division trophy was presented to the team on Saturday 28 August by Trevor Coe of the Craven League at the ground of Sandy Lane Cricket Club.

Poet Blake Morrison grew up in the village.

References

External links

Villages in North Yorkshire
Civil parishes in North Yorkshire
Holy wells in England
Craven District